Children of Eden is a 1991 musical with music and lyrics by Stephen Schwartz and a book by John Caird. The musical is based on the Book of Genesis, with Act I telling the story of Adam and Eve, and Cain and Abel, while Act II deals with Noah and the flood.

Though commercially the musical has had very little success, it is popular in community and regional theatres worldwide, due to its ability to accommodate a large or small cast, religious subject, and its universal themes of family and love. The show's publisher, Music Theatre International, reports that Children of Eden is one of its top 20 most frequently licensed properties.

Production history

Origins
Children of Eden was originally written in 1986 as Family Tree for a production by Youth Sing Praise, a religious-oriented high school theatre camp performed at the National Shrine of Our Lady of the Snows in Belleville, Illinois. Stephen Schwartz adapted the script and music of Family Tree into a full-length musical, giving it the title it uses today.

Original London Production
The original cast production of Children of Eden was developed as a Royal Shakespeare Company (RSC) workshop. The production was directed by John Caird, and starred Ken Page as Father, Richard Lloyd-King as the Snake, Martin Smith as Adam, Shezwae Powell as Eve, Adrian Beaumont as Cain, Kevin Colson as Noah, Earlene Bentley as Mama Noah, Frances Ruffelle as Yonah, Anthony Barclay as Japheth, Craig Pinder as Shem, Ray Shell as Ham, Hiromi Itoh as Aysha and Ruthie Henshall as Aphra. After the RSC's budget was cut, it instead opened at the Prince Edward Theatre in London's West End on January 8, 1991. The show closed on April 6, 1991, due to poor reviews and the negative effects the Persian Gulf War had on tourism worldwide.

Because of the show's poor reviews and quick closing, the idea of a Broadway transfer was abandoned. Schwartz believes the show has not played on Broadway because of the expense required to produce it in an Actor's Equity house, due to the cast of characters.

American Premiere
Throughout the 1990s, the show received numerous productions at both the amateur and professional levels; it was also reworked and edited, with songs and scenes being added and cut. In 1997, a major production was mounted at the Paper Mill Playhouse in Millburn, New Jersey. The production ran from November 5 to December 14, 1997. In contrast to the London production, the Paper Mill production had actors double roles. A cast recording of this production was produced by Schwartz himself. This revised version, commonly known as the "American version" or "Paper Mill version", is substantially what is currently licensed for production in the United States.

The cast featured William Solo as Father, Adrian Zmed as Adam/Noah, Stephanie Mills as Eve/Mama Noah, Darius de Haas as Cain/Japheth, Hunter Foster as Abel/Ham, and Kelli Rabke as Yonah.

Subsequent Productions

The New York City premiere of the piece was as the inaugural World AIDS Day Concert presented by Jamie McGonnigal and Kate Shindle for The York Theatre Company. The concert featured Norm Lewis as Father, Julia Murney as Eve/Mama Noah, Darius de Haas as Cain/Japheth, Max von Essen as Abel/Ham, Kate Shindle as Yonah, John Tartaglia as Seth/Shem, Ann Harada as Aysha, and Laura Benanti as the Snake. The concert raised funds for The National AIDS Fund and was presented December 1, 2003, at Riverside Church.

A Gala charity concert adaptation ran for one night only at the Prince of Wales theatre in London on 29 January 2012. The concert was produced to support Crohn's and Colitis UK and featured performers from London's West End theatre community and from UK television.

In 2013 Children of Eden was presented in Melbourne, Australia by award-winning production company Magnormos, as the finale of their Stephen Schwartz Celebration Triptych, which also featured Godspell and Pippin. Composer Stephen Schwartz was in attendance.

A one-night only concert was presented at the John F. Kennedy Center for the Performing Arts in Washington, D.C., on May 19, 2014.  The concert featured Ron Bohmer as Father, Charl Brown as Adam/Noah, Ashley Brown as Eve/Mama Noah, Jeremy Jordan as Cain/Japheth, and Rebecca Naomi Jones as Yonah.  The production was accompanied by the Kennedy Center Opera House Orchestra and the National Broadway Chorus, and was attended by composer Stephen Schwartz.

In 2015, the show was adapted into a junior version by Lindsay Maron and was presented at the Summit Playhouse in Summit, NJ from July 24-August 2, with preview performances July 17–19. The production was directed and choreographed by Maron with musical direction and musical arrangements by Alex Ratner. The cast included 37 performers from all over the tristate area. Stephen Schwartz and executives from MTI attended the production and the junior version of the show is now available through MTI.

In 2016, Children of Eden marked its 30th anniversary. In celebration of this achievement, Youth Sing Praise, the same religious-oriented high school theatre camp that premiered it in 1986, performed the show at the National Shrine of Our Lady of the Snows in Belleville, Illinois, on June 25, 2016, to a crowd of over 1,000 people.

In 2016, 25 years after its original London production, Children of Eden was revived at the new Union Theatre in Southwark, London.

In 2019, Schwartz announced a planned Chicago production in 2020 and its possible filming. The production was later postponed indefinitely due to COVID-19 and had planned to open in Chicago's Arcada Theatre in 2022. The production was set to feature Norm Lewis, Deborah Cox, David Phelps, America's Got Talent alum Brian Justin Crum, and Kirstin Maldonado of Pentatonix. The production was later put on as a concert on October 15, 2022, at the Cadillac Palace Theatre. The cast featured Randal Keith as Father, David Phelps as Adam/Noah, Michelle Williams as Eve/Mama Noah, Sam Tsui as Cain/Japheth, Chris Graham as Abel/Ham, and Koryn Hawthorne as Yonah. The production will be streamed sometime in 2023 ahead of a Broadway-aimed production in Chicago.

Recordings

The Original London Cast Recording was released on LP and CD, but quickly went out of print. The CD release was marred by manufacturing defects that caused most of the discs to "bronze", and become unplayable. Consequently, a playable copy of the disc is highly prized by musical theatre collectors.

The rarest recording of the show is a concept recording released after changes were made following the 1991 London production.  The tracks feature Stephen Schwartz himself playing the piano.  The recording was made before the Papermill Playhouse production in an effort to review the rewrites and revisions.  The album was made available only for a limited time on Stephen Schwartz's website via RealAudio streaming.  This recording is considered to be the rarest version of the show that exists.  There are only a handful of copies of this recording in existence.

The Paper Mill Playhouse Cast was recorded in 1998. The recording was financed by Stephen Schwartz. It is the only professional recording of the show in its revised state.

Synopsis

Act I

The musical opens with the creation story from the Book of Genesis. Storytellers, who narrate the piece, help Father (the God-character, who is always addressed as "Father") bring the universe and life into existence, including Father's new children, Adam and Eve ("Let There Be"). Eve finds herself drawn to the Tree of Knowledge, but Father tells her to stay away from "that tree," though he provides no clear reason why ("The Tree of Knowledge"). Father attempts to distract the two with a game where they name all the animals in the garden ("The Naming"). With everything right in the newly created world, Father reflects on parenthood and Adam and Eve fall in love with one another ("Grateful Children", "Father's Day", and "Perfect"). Even though her life is perfect, Eve still hungers for something more: to see what lies beyond the garden ("The Spark of Creation"). Eve then meets a snake who tempts her with the fruit from the forbidden tree and the possibilities that open up for her if she eats it. ("In Pursuit of Excellence"). Eve eats the fruit and is awakened to possibility and the world that lies beyond. ("The End of a Perfect Day" and "Childhood's End"). Later that night, Eve attempts to trick Adam into eating the apple in several apple-related dishes., though she stops him before he consumes any of them. Eve tells Adam that she ate of the Tree of Knowledge and the two hide in the garden from Father.

Father finds his children and, after discovering Eve has eaten the apple, tells her that she must leave the garden as she is no longer innocent. And, in a twist from the Genesis tale, Adam is then torn between these two choices: he can either stay with Father in Eden, or he can eat the fruit and be banished with Eve. Adam decides that, even though it means leaving the garden that he loves with all his heart, he must be with Eve ("A World Without You"). Adam and Eve are driven out of the garden by Father into the wasteland surrounding the garden and have two children, Cain and Abel ("The Expulsion" and "The Wasteland").

Several years later, Adam, Eve, Cain, and Abel continue their lives, hoping and praying that Father will one day bring them home to Eden. Out of fear for their children's safety, Adam and Eve have set their glen as the boundary, preventing them from going beyond the waterfall. As the children grow, Eve realizes that the same fire that she once had is present in her son, Cain ("The Spark of Creation (Reprise 1)"). Cain, like his mother, longs to see the world. Cain complains to Abel that their parents won't let them see the world beyond the glen and that Adam and Eve seemingly let themselves get kicked out of Eden ("Lost in the Wilderness"). He begs Abel to leave to find the glen with him, as Father appears. Father shows his love and affection and promises the brothers their very own wives. Having never seen Father, they are shocked and assume that he has arrived to take them all back to the garden. However, it quickly becomes clear that Father has no intention of seeing their parents or taking any of them back to Eden. Cain, further embittered, packs his things, tells Father and Abel that he is going to go find his future out in the wasteland, and leaves the glen ("Lost in the Wilderness (Reprise)"). Father tells Abel to keep his visit secret from his parents, but that he will return to them.

Adam and Eve, deeply worried about Cain's safety out in the Wasteland, find some comfort in the fact that they have been able to create a life and family for themselves outside of Eden ("Close to Home"), but this peacefulness is once again shattered when Cain, back from his journey, tells the family that he has found a ring of giant stones, seemingly providing evidence of other humans. Cain takes the family to see the stones in the wasteland, with Eve and Abel just as excited as Cain. Adam, however, admits to his family that he had seen the ring of stones and those who live there years before, but never told them as he was afraid of the potential consequences ("A Ring of Stones" and "Clash of the Generations"). Adam's betrayal quickly leads to a family-wide fight, culminating in Cain threatening to leave forever and taking Abel with him. Abel, fighting through his heartbreak, decides to stay with his parents. Cain, beginning to leave, is forcibly stopped by Adam, who slaps Cain, which sends him to the ground. Cain tells Adam that he will kill him and the two attempt to fight, but when Abel intervenes, he is thrown off Cain, who, in his rage, beats him to death with a stone ("The Death of Abel"). Cain leaves the remaining members of his family, telling Adam that it should have been him that should be dead. Father, in his anger, decrees that Cain's descendants will always bear a mark for the sin of their ancestor ("The Mark of Cain").

Many years after Abel's death and Cain's departure, Eve lives with her children and grandchildren and prepares herself for death. She attempts to speak to Father about Cain's departure from the family, Adam's grief over the loss of both his sons, the birth of another son, Seth, who has since had children of his own, and Adam's recent death. She prays that her children and her grandchildren will regain the garden that was lost, as Father allows her into heaven ("Children of Eden").

Act II

The storytellers reconvene and continue their story, following the lineage of both Seth and Cain, eventually tracing all the way down to Noah and his family, whose story comprises the plot of the 2nd act  ("Generations").

Father, after centuries of facing the race of Cain, tells Noah that a storm is coming to wipe them all away, save Noah's family, as they remain the few who are untainted by Cain's lineage. Noah begs Father to reconsider, but Father leaves him with the command to build an ark for both his family and two of every animal ("The Gathering Storm").

Noah has three sons, and the eldest two, Shem and Ham, have wives, but his youngest son, Japheth, is unhappy with the wives Noah has tried to obtain for him. Instead, he wishes to marry the servant-girl, Yonah, a descendant of the race of Cain, and Japheth tells this to his surprised family ("A Piece of Eight"); however, Noah will not allow Yonah on the ark, due to her being a part of the race of Cain. All the animals, played by the Storytellers, come to the ark so that they can board and be saved from the flood ("The Return of the Animals" and "Noah's Lullaby"). Later, Noah finds Yonah outside and explains to her that she cannot board the ark, though he wishes she could and he leaves to board. She understands her plight and continues to face her problems with an open heart and mind, as she always has ("Stranger to the Rain"). Japheth finds Yonah as she's leaving and attempts to convince her to sneak on to the ark with him. Japheth tells Yonah that he doesn't care about the repercussions of his actions, as long as he can be with her. The two vow to spend whatever time they have left with one another and board the ark ("In Whatever Time We Have"), just as Father unleashes his wrath on the earth and the race of Cain ("The Flood").

For forty days and forty nights, the rain continues, never ceasing, and tensions on the ark are high, with couples fighting and discussions on how to stay alive in these desperate conditions, including killing animals on the ark for food ("What is He Waiting For?"). Yonah, having stayed undiscovered, releases a dove to find dry land and save the residents of the ark ("Sailor of the Skies"). The family discovers Yonah, and Shem and Ham wish to throw her overboard, but Japheth intervenes.  It escalates into a fight, directly mirroring the one between Adam and Cain generations ago, and it is only because Yonah intervenes that one of the brothers is not killed. Noah is unsure as to what he must do, sends the family away from him and attempts to talk to Father. His wife asks him if Father speaks to him anymore, and when Noah answers "No", she tells him, "You must be the father now;" that Noah has to live without God telling him what to do ("The Spark of Creation (Reprise 2)"). Noah sings of the difficulties that he has faced in being a father, while at the same time Father sings of the problems he has faced in being a father, but both come to terms with the fact that if you love something, you must let it go ("The Hardest Part of Love").

Noah calls the family together once more, all of them desperate for guidance and hope ("Words of Doom"). He decides to give Japheth and Yonah his blessing as the family gathers together to spend whatever time they have left as a happy, loving family ("The Hour of Darkness"). Then the dove Yonah released returns with an olive branch in its mouth, signifying nearby land, and the family again sees the light of the stars. The family rejoices as Mama leads the family in the gospel song ("Ain't It Good?"). Father gives humanity the power to control its fate and gives his blessing to find their future without his direct influence ("Precious Children"). As the family lands and leaves the ark, they separate, taking various animals to their new homes across the world. As they say their final goodbyes, the family sings of the problems they will face and their desire to return someday to the Garden of Eden ("In the Beginning").

Musical numbers
Act I
 Let There Be – Father, Storytellers
 Perfect (Part 1) – Storytellers, Father, Adam & Eve
 The Tree of Knowledge – Father & Adam
 The Naming – Father, Adam, Eve & Storytellers
 Grateful Children – Adam & Eve
 Father's Day – Father
 Perfect (Part 2) – Storytellers, Father, Adam & Eve
 The Spark of Creation – Eve
 In Pursuit of Excellence – Snake & Eve
 The End of a Perfect Day – Storytellers
 Childhood's End – Storytellers, Father & Eve
 A World Without You – Adam, Father & Eve
 The Expulsion – Father & Storytellers
 The Wasteland – Storytellers
 Wilderness Family – Adam, Young Cain & Young Abel
 The Spark of Creation (Reprise 1) – Eve
 Lost in the Wilderness – Cain & Abel
 Lost in the Wilderness (Reprise) – Cain & Father
 Close to Home – Adam, Eve, Abel, Young Cain & Young Abel
 A Ring of Stones – Adam, Eve, Cain & Abel
 Clash of the Generations – Adam, Eve, Cain & Abel
 The Death of Abel – Eve & Storytellers
 The Mark of Cain – Father & Storytellers
 Children of Eden – Eve & Storytellers

Act II
 Generations – Storytellers
 The Gathering Storm – Noah & Father
 A Piece of Eight – Storytellers, Noah, Mama Noah, Japheth, Yonah, Ham, Shem, Aphra & Aysha
 Blind Obedience – Noah
 The Return of the Animals – Orchestra
 The Naming (Reprise)/Noah's Lullaby – Storytellers & Noah
 Stranger to the Rain – Yonah
 In Whatever Time We Have – Japheth & Yonah
 The Flood – Father & Storytellers
 What is He Waiting For? – Noah, Mama Noah, Ham, Shem, Aphra & Aysha
 Sailor of the Skies – Yonah
 The Spark of Creation (Reprise 2) – Mama Noah
 The Hardest Part of Love – Noah & Father
 Words of Doom – Storytellers
 The Hour of Darkness – Noah, Mama Noah, Japheth, Yonah, Ham, Shem, Aphra & Aysha
 Ain’t it Good? – Mama Noah, Noah, Japheth, Ham, Yonah, Shem, Aphra, Aysha, & Storytellers
 Precious Children – Father
 In the Beginning – Japheth, Yonah, Noah, Mama Noah, Father, Ham, Shem, Aphra, Aysha & Storytellers

Casts

Original cast

References

External links
Children of Eden
 Children of Eden at the Music Theatre International website

1991 musicals
West End musicals
Musicals based on religious traditions
Musicals based on the Bible
Cultural depictions of Adam and Eve
Musicals by Stephen Schwartz